Julian Sinclair Smith (May 5, 1920 – April 19, 1993) was an American electrical engineer and television executive. He was the founder of the Sinclair Broadcast Group.

Early life
Smith was born in 1920 in Baltimore, the son of a grain exporter. He received his electrical engineering degree from Johns Hopkins University in 1952.

Career

In 1958, Smith, an electrical engineer, along with a group of shareholders, formed the Commercial Radio Institute, a broadcasting trade school in Baltimore, Maryland. Commercial Radio Institute later applied to build an FM radio station, which would eventually become known as Sinclair Broadcast Group in 1971 as a single local television station; namely, Baltimore, Maryland's WBFF-TV. In 1986, he and his family incorporated Sinclair Broadcast Group, decided upon by his sons, as a namesake and his legacy for the company.

Personal life and death
Smith married Carolyn Beth Cunningham. They had four sons, including David, who became CEO of the Sinclair Broadcast Group in 1988.

Smith died in 1993, at the age of 72, after suffering from Parkinson's disease. As of December 2016, his four sons are the majority shareholders of Sinclair Broadcast Group.

References

1920 births
1993 deaths
People from Baltimore
American electrical engineers
American television executives
Johns Hopkins University alumni
Sinclair Broadcast Group
20th-century American engineers